The 2019 The Citadel Bulldogs football team represents The Citadel, The Military College of South Carolina in the 2019 NCAA Division I FCS football season. The Bulldogs are led by fourth-year head coach Brent Thompson and play their home games at Johnson Hagood Stadium. They are members of the Southern Conference (SoCon).

Previous season
The Bulldogs finished the 2018 season 5–6, 4–4 in SoCon play to finish in a three-way tie for fifth place.

Preseason

Preseason media poll
The SoCon released their preseason media poll and coaches poll on July 22, 2019. The Bulldogs were picked to finish in 7th place in both polls.

Preseason All-SoCon Teams
The Bulldogs placed six players on the preseason all-SoCon teams.

Offense

2nd team

Haden Haas – OL

Drew McEntyre – OL

Defense

1st team

Joseph Randolph II – DL

Willie Eubanks III – LB

Specialists

1st team

Matthew Campbell – P

2nd team

Jacob Godek – PK

Schedule

Roster

Game summaries

Towson

at Elon

at Georgia Tech

Charleston Southern

at Samford

VMI

Western Carolina

at Furman

Mercer

at East Tennessee State

at Chattanooga

Wofford

Source:

Ranking movements

References

Citadel
The Citadel Bulldogs football seasons
Citadel Football